Zanthoxylum collinsiae is a woody plant in the family Rutaceae, its native range is Yunnan, Guizhou, and Guangxi in China to Indo-China.

References 

collinsiae
Flora of China
Taxa named by William Grant Craib